S'Espalmador is a small, privately owned uninhabited island located in the Balearic Islands.

Features 

The island is just to the north of Formentera, from which it is separated by a shallow sandbar. During low tide, it is possible to wade between the two islands. The area is visited by canoeists and yachts heading between Ibiza and Formentera. The island has pristine beaches, freshwater springs and a mud-bath.

To the north of the main island is Illa des Porcs (Pig Island) which was once used as a hideout and stronghold for pig smugglers. The En Pou lighthouse was built on the island in 1861 to mark the southern side of the Es Freus strait between the island and Ibiza.

The island had been owned by the Cinnamond family who bought it for the equivalent of €252 in 1932. In March 2018, despite efforts at purchase by the Formentera government, Catalan architect Norman Cinnamond and his sister Rosy sold the island to two wealthy Belgian businessmen, brothers Christian Cigrang and Jean Cigrang for £16 million (~€18 million).

Gallery

References

Uninhabited islands of Spain
Islands of the Balearic Islands